Norske Løve (Danish and Norwegian, 'Norwegian Lion') may refer to:

Ships
 Norske Løve, the name of several ships in the History of the Danish navy
 Norske Løve (1704), of the Danish East India Company

Buildings
 Norske Løve Fortress, in Horten, Norway
 Norske Løve, Køge, a former mail and coaching inn in Denmark

See also
Coat of arms of Norway